Saša Martinović may refer to:

 Saša Martinović (ice hockey player)
 Saša Martinović (chess player)